Pot cheese is a type of soft, crumbly, unaged cheese. It is very simple to make and also highly versatile, making it a very popular cheese, but it may be hard to find in stores. Pot cheese is in the midway stage between cottage cheese and farmer cheese. It is somewhat dry and crumbly, but with a neutral, creamy texture and is very high in protein. It is most similar to cream cheese, ricotta, and the Mexican queso blanco. In New York and its environs, it was frequently served in a bowl topped with cut-up vegetables.

In Austria, Topfen (pot cheese) is another name for Quark.

It is traditionally cut with a sun-shaped object known as a cheese cutter.

See also
 Hoop cheese

References

Cow's-milk cheeses